Julian Bibleka (born 4 May 1996), is a Kosovar professional footballer who plays as a goalkeeper for German club 1. FC Kaan-Marienborn. He made one appearance for the Kosovo national team in 2014.

Club career

Early career
Bibleka started his youth career at SSV Frohnhausen, a local academy in Germany. Then he played for various fellow German club academies such as JSG Mittenaar/Siegbach/Burg, VfB Gießen, TSG Wieseck, before he joined the Eintracht Frankfurt academies in 2010. With Eintracht Frankfurt Bibleka won the Hessen cup by defeating FSV Frankfurt U-19 3–1 in a match in which Bibleka was considered decisive with several saves.

International career
Being of Albanian descent, in April 2013 Bibleka participated in a gathering of young Albanians footballers born in 1997–1998 and 1995–1996 even, organised by the FSHF (Albanian Football Association) in Switzerland with the participations of the Albania national under-17 football team and Albania national under-19 football team respective coaches at the time, Džemal Mustedanagić and Foto Strakosha. Bibleka became one of 12 young talents suggested to FSHF by Jetmir Salihu (a simple Albanian football fan part of Tifozat Kuq e Zi, which later became a representative of FSHF for Kosovo) to be selected to the Albania national youth football teams at least one time.

Kosovo
Bibleka was called up to Kosovo national football team by the coach Albert Bunjaki for the two FIFAs sanctioned matches against Turkey and Senegal in May 2014. He made it his debut for Kosovo on 25 May 2014 against Senegal, coming on as a substitute in the 79th minute in place of Kushtrim Mushica in a 3–1 loss.

Career statistics

Club

International

References

External links
 
 

1996 births
Living people
Association football goalkeepers
Kosovo Albanians
Albanian footballers
Albania youth international footballers
Kosovan footballers
Kosovo international footballers
TSV Steinbach Haiger players
FC Rot-Weiß Koblenz players
1. FC Kaan-Marienborn players
Regionalliga players
Albanian expatriate footballers
Kosovan expatriate footballers
Albanian expatriate sportspeople in Germany
Kosovan expatriate sportspeople in Germany
Expatriate footballers in Germany